Elsfleth is a town in the district of Wesermarsch, Lower Saxony, Germany. It is situated at the confluence of the Hunte with the Weser, on the left bank of the Weser. 
It has a school of navigation (university of applied sciences), a harbour and docks.

Elsfleth offers many recreational facilities even though it is a small town,. It is an ideal place for families that want to escape big cities and like outdoor activities that are not only limited to tennis and biking. A nearby beach area and sailing club "SWE" contribute to Elsfleth's maritime character. So does the tall ship club Großherzogin Elisabeth amicably called "Lissi". Nearby larger cities are Brake, Nordenham, Oldenburg, and Bremen.

Sons and daughters of the city

 Friedrich Bolte (1860-1940), Director of the Hamburg Navigation School
 Karl Schröder (1890-1966), tax consultant and politician (SPD)
 Erich Zander (1906-1985), jurist, politician (CDU)
 Horst Karsten (born 1936), versatility rider, Olympic medal winner

Connected to Elsfleth

 Anthony Günther, Count of Oldenburg (1583-1667) introduced the Elsfleth Weser toll 
 Frederick William, Duke of Brunswick-Wolfenbüttel (1771-1815);
 Wilhelm von Freeden (1822-1894), mathematician, natural scientist, oceanographer 
 Heinrich Emil Timerding (1873-1945), mathematician, was professor at the sea school in Elsfleth around 1900
 Bernhard Müller (1887-1970), politician (SPD), lived in Elsfleth

References

Wesermarsch